is an action hack and slash video game developed by PlatinumGames and published by Activision. It is inspired by IDW Publishing's Teenage Mutant Ninja Turtles comic book series. It was released for PlayStation 3, PlayStation 4, Windows, Xbox 360, and Xbox One on May 24, 2016. Less than eight months after its release, the game was removed from sale from all digital storefronts on January 3, 2017. This was the last Nickelodeon game to be published by Activision, with the rights for the Teenage Mutant Ninja Turtles video game series being given to Dotemu.

Gameplay
The game is an action hack and slash game with cel-shaded artstyle, in which players control the title characters, including Leonardo, Donatello, Michelangelo and Raphael, from a third-person perspective. With the exception of infinite shurikens, each turtle has an individual style of ninjutsu. Each turtle also has four ultimate abilities, which are interchangeable and shared from a well-sized list. For example, Leonardo can slow down time, and Michelangelo can perform cheerleading, which resets the cooldowns of other turtles' abilities. Players can shift between turtles at will in the single-player campaign. The turtles can perform successive attacks to create a combo. The four turtles also have the ability to parkour and use parachutes while traveling around the game's world. Players encounter numerous green orbs in the game. These orbs, known as Battle Points can be spent to upgrade the turtles' abilities - as well as buying items (such as grappling hooks and rocket launchers) from Master Splinter anytime during the game. April O' Neil provides assistance to players by giving hints and directions. The turtles can also scan their surroundings and tag enemies.

The game is divided into nine different stages. In each stage, players encounter random enemies before reaching a boss. When the player character is defeated, other turtles (controlled by artificial intelligence in the campaign or by other players in the multiplayer) can help revive the players. If the turtles are not revived, they will be sent back to the subterranean lair. A mini-game will then begin, tasking the turtle to eat pizza as fast as possible. The game supports four-player online cooperative multiplayer.

Plot
The four Ninja Turtles find the Foot Clan causing trouble in New York City once again. After the streets are cleared, the turtles are told by April via T-Glass that Bebop is robbing a bank and is well-armed with chainsaw, explosive bombs and guns. Working together, the turtles defeat Bebop, before learning that his partner Rocksteady is also causing trouble, threatening to destroy the subway system with time bombs. Upon defeating the hammer-swinging Rocksteady, the four turtle brothers are again contacted by April, who reveals that Slash is hiding deep in the sewers, so the turtles investigate, while watching out for Slash, who is constantly taunting them. The turtles are directed to a construction site high up in the skyscrapers, where Karai has placed explosives, whom they defuse before fighting Karai, who then escapes via jet-pack.

The turtles next face off against Armaggon, before also encountering Wingnut, whom they soon defeat. Afterwards, General Krang, not impressed by the turtles defeating his minions, attacks New York himself, but is also ultimately defeated, though the turtles celebrate too early, as Krang then upgrades himself and becomes "Mega Krang." The turtles once again triumph over Krang, before being attacked by Shredder himself, who is annoyed with everyone else's failure to destroy them and attempts to do it himself. Shredder proves to be their biggest challenge yet, but through teamwork and their experience, the turtles prevail, saving New York from the Foot Clan, at least for the moment.

Development
According to developer PlatinumGames, the team developed licensed video games as creating new intellectual properties was difficult. Mutants in Manhattan is the third licensed game developed by Platinum, after the company partnered with Activision to create The Legend of Korra (2014) and Transformers: Devastation (2015). According to Platinum, they developed the game based on their own vision instead of the previous comics, films or games. According to game designer Eiro Shirahama, the team watched the TMNT animated series and also played the old TMNT games for the Super Famicom while working on the game so as to understand the universe and the characters. Tom Waltz, who had previously written TMNT comic books for IDW Publishing, is the game's lead writer. The game's artstyle was inspired by Mateus Santolouco, an artist of the series. The game's existence was first leaked by Xbox.com, Australian Classification Board and a user on Twitter. PlatinumGames later officially announced the title on January 26, 2016. Teenage Mutant Ninja Turtles: Mutants in Manhattan was released for PlayStation 3, PlayStation 4, Windows, Xbox 360, and Xbox One on May 24, 2016.

Reception

Teenage Mutant Ninja Turtles: Mutants in Manhattan received "mixed or average" reviews on the Xbox One and PC, and received "generally unfavorable" reviews on the PlayStation 4, according to video game review aggregator Metacritic.

Ben Makedonski from Destructoid awarded it a score of 4.5 out of 10, stating "it doesn't even necessarily succeed where Platinum Games usually excels."

Dave Rudden from IGN rated it 4.9 out of 10, calling the game short, bland, and highly repetitive, while also expressing criticism at the lack of local co-op multiplayer.

Digital Foundry's John Linneman criticized the game for not reaching 60 frames per second on any platform, even though an Activision producer stated that local co-op multiplayer was omitted to reach it.

Game Informer awarded it a score of 6 out of 10, saying "Controlling the turtles is fun, but the structure of the levels, missions, and bosses leave much to be desired"

Hardcore Gamer awarded it a score of 2 out of 5, saying "About the only real way one can recommend Mutants in Manhattan is if you’re a really die-hard Ninja Turtles fan and have access to online multiplayer, and even then, the tedious level and mission design is sure to get grating after a while. In the end, sadly, not even an old-fashioned Ninja Rap could save this mess."

GameSpot awarded it a score of 4 out of 10, saying "Without a doubt, Mutants In Manhattan is a disappointment, one multiplied several times over not just by its pedigree, but by the fact that the ingredients for a good game are present."

Notes

References

External links
 

2016 video games
Action video games
Activision games
Hack and slash games
Multiplayer and single-player video games
PlatinumGames games
PlayStation 3 games
PlayStation 4 games
Science fiction video games
Mutants in Manhattan
Video games developed in Japan
Video games set in New York City
Video games with cel-shaded animation
Windows games
Xbox 360 games
Xbox One games